The 2010 season was Negeri Sembilan's 5th season in Malaysia Super League since it was first introduced in 2004, the top flight of Malaysian football.

Negeri Sembilan played in the Malaysian Super League and the Malaysian FA Cup. Negeri Sembilan qualified for the Malaysia Cup, after finishing seventh in the Super League, Negeri qualified for the Malaysia Cup final for the first time  with their coach Wan Jamak Wan Hassan. They won the trophy after defeating Kelantan FA. Midfielder Shahurain Abu Samah capitalised on a defensive mix-up in the Kelantan box to open the scoring in the 18th minute before on-loan Malaysian international striker Hairuddin Omar doubled the lead a minute into the second half. Mohd Zaquan Adha Abdul Radzak put the result beyond doubt when he converted a penalty in the 58th minute after Shahurain Abu Samah was brought down. Kelantan, who were chasing their first Malaysia Cup title after finishing runner-up, scored a consolation goal in stoppage time through a free-kick from striker Indra Putra Mahayuddin, the competition's leading scorer. Negeri ended their FA campaign at Semi-Final, defeated by Kelantan FA.

Season review

Three new faces in the squad of the 2010 season were Kaharuddin Rahman, Fiqri Azwan Ghazali and Mohd Norizam Salaman. While six who chose not to renew their contracts were Muhd Arif Ismail, K. Ravindran, Mohd Affify Khusli, Muhamad Asyriff Afiq Shahrulzaman, I. Arulchelvan and Mohd Faiz Isa.

Club

Coaching staff

Kit manufacturers and financial sponsor

Player information

Full squad

Transfers

In

Out

Loan for Malaysia Cup

Non-competitive

Friendly match

Competitions

Malaysia Super League

Malaysia FA Cup

Malaysia Cup

Season statistics

League table

Top scorers

References 

Negeri Sembilan FA seasons
Negeri Sembilan